Robert "Robbie" AhMat (born 19 July 1977), is a former Australian rules footballer. His ancestors were Aboriginal and Torres Strait Islanders.

Ahmat's cousins are Matthew Ahmat (Brisbane/Sydney), Andrew McLeod (Adelaide) and Nakia Cockatoo (Geelong).

Ahmat was the second Aboriginal person to play for Collingwood Football Club, after Wally Lovett played a few games in the early 1980s.
After being delisted from the AFL, he joined South Australian National Football League club Norwood for two seasons and kicked 13 goals.

References

External links
 
 

1977 births
Living people
Indigenous Australian players of Australian rules football
Sydney Swans players
Collingwood Football Club players
Darwin Football Club players
Australian rules footballers from the Northern Territory
Australian people of Malaysian descent
Australian people of Malay descent
Nightcliff Football Club players